This is a list of defunct radio stations in Canada. Note: These stations have ceased operations. Stations which have changed frequencies, such as moving from the AM to the FM band, are not listed.  


See also
List of defunct CBC radio transmitters in Canada
Radio Canada International

Notes
On March 3, 1986, the CRTC approved the Canadian Broadcasting Corporation's application to add low-power English-language AM radio stations in the following communities: Carolin, Coquihalla Lakes, Haig, Hope, Hunter Creek, Kingsvale, Merritt North, Merritt South and Sowaqua, British Columbia. The stations would operate on the frequency of 1490 kHz, each with a transmitter power of 20 watts, to provide a travellers information service. The CRTC also approved the CBC's application to operate a radio station at Swartz Bay Ferry Terminal, on the frequency 1260 kHz with a transmitter power of 5 watts, to provide a marine and local weather service. The CRTC approved the CBC's application to operate a French-language AM radio station at Elk Island National Park, Alberta on frequency 1210 kHz with a day-time and night-time power of 20 watts  and an English-language radio station to operate at 1540 kHz. It is currently unknown if these radio stations are still in operation.

References

Defunct